SLIT and NTRK-like protein 6 is a protein that in humans is encoded by the SLITRK6 gene.

Function 

Members of the SLITRK family, such as SLITRK6, are integral membrane proteins with 2 N-terminal leucine-rich repeat (LRR) domains similar to those of SLIT proteins (see SLIT1). Most SLITRKs, including SLITRK6, also have C-terminal regions that share homology with neurotrophin receptors (see NTRK1). SLITRKs are expressed predominantly in neural tissues and have neurite-modulating activity.

Clinical significance 

Mutations in SLITRK6 cause high myopia and deafness in humans and mice.

As a drug target

The protein is the target for the antibody-drug conjugate ASG-15ME which is in phase 1 clinical trials for urothelial cancer.

References

Further reading